The Priory of St. Mary in Cahir, known as Cahir Abbey, was a medieval priory of Augustinian Canons regular and is a National Monument located in Cahir, Ireland.

Location

History
The priory was founded in the late 12th century AD. Galfrid de Camville, Anglo-Norman Baron of Cahir and Fedamore, made a grant to its hospital c. 1200.

St Mary’s priory is a multi phased, with evidence of the original 13th century buildings  and further alterations and additions  in the 15th and 16th/17th centuries.

The priory was dissolved in 1540 and surrendered by prior Edmond O'Lonergan; the church, parochial and conventual buildings were occupied by Sir Thomas Butler by January 1541. The priory was alienated by William Hutchinson and Edward Walshe 1561 and granted to Edmond Butler in 1566.

Buildings
The chancel of the church survives, with a row of windows in the north wall; also there are carved corbels and mouldings in limestone. 

There is a residential tower, apparently seventeenth century in date, immediately west of the chancel.

There are also a cloister and domestic buildings. Mason's marks are visible.

References

Augustinian monasteries in the Republic of Ireland
Religion in County Tipperary
Archaeological sites in County Tipperary
National Monuments in County Tipperary
Cahir
Monasteries dissolved under the Irish Reformation